A suicide bombing occurred on March 21, 2002 outside a clothing store and toy shop on King George Street in Jerusalem. Three Israeli civilians were killed in the attack.

The Palestinian militant organization al-Aqsa Martyrs Brigades claimed responsibility for the attack.

The attack
On Thursday afternoon, 21 March 2002, a Palestinian suicide bomber detonated the explosive device, hidden underneath his jacket, in the middle of Jerusalem's shopping district in the King George Street in downtown Jerusalem amongst a crowd of shoppers.

The blast killed three civilians and more than 40 people were wounded, seven of them seriously.

The perpetrators 
After the attack the Palestinian militia al-Aqsa Martyrs Brigades claimed responsibility for the bombing and stated that the perpetrator was Mohammad Hashaika, a 22-year-old from the West Bank village of Talluza near Nablus. Hashaika was a member of the Tanzim and a former Palestinian policeman. Later on, it was revealed that Hashaika was actually arrested for allegedly planning to carry out an earlier attack. Nevertheless, the Palestinian authority released him a week before he managed to carry out this suicide bombing.

References

External links 
 Bomb rips through Jerusalem shopping centre - published on The Guardian on 21 March 2002
 Jerusalem Blast Kills 3, Hurts 100 - published on The Daily News of New York City on 22 March 2002

2002 murders in Asia
Suicide bombings in 2002
Suicide bombing in the Israeli–Palestinian conflict
Terrorist incidents in Israel in 2002
Terrorist attacks attributed to Palestinian militant groups
Terrorist incidents in Jerusalem
2002 in Jerusalem
March 2002 events in Asia
Terrorist incidents in Jerusalem in the 2000s